The 1998 Saint Silvester Road Race was the 74th edition of the Saint Silvester Road Race and held in São Paulo, Brazil, on December 31, 1998.  The distance ran by the participating athletes was 15 km.

The men's race was won by Kenya's Paul Tergat, his third victory, whereas the women's event was won by Serbia and Montenegro's Olivera Jevtić, her first triumph.

The podiums were composed of the first seven men and the first five women.

Classification

Men

For the complete record, with all the 9,390 runners that qualified in the official results board, please visit the referenced website below.

Women

For a complete record, with all the 750 runners that qualified in the official results board, please visit the official website referenced below.

References

 Men's results: Official Saint Silvester detailed results
 Women's results: Official Saint Silvester detailed results

External links
 Official website (in Portuguese)

1998 in athletics (track and field)
1998 in Brazilian sport
December 1998 sports events in South America
20th century in São Paulo